Nationality words link to articles with information on the nation's poetry or literature (for instance, Irish or France).

Events
 Immediately after the September 11 attacks in the United States, W. H. Auden's "September 1, 1939" was read (with many lines omitted) on National Public Radio and widely circulated and discussed for its relevance to recent events. On September 19, Amiri Baraka read his poem "Somebody Blew Up America?" at a poetry festival in New Jersey.
 December 9–10 — Professor John Basinger, 67, performed, from memory, John Milton's Paradise Lost at Three Rivers Community-Technical College in Norwich, Connecticut, a feat that took 18 hours.
 American computer hacker Seth Schoen wrote DeCSS haiku as one of a number of artworks intended to demonstrate that source code should be accorded the privileges of freedom of speech.
 In The Best American Poetry 2001, poet and guest editor Robert Hass wrote, "There are roughly three traditions in American poetry at this point: a metrical tradition that can be very nervy and that is also basically classical in impulse; a strong central tradition of free verse made out of both romanticism and modernism, split between the impulses of an inward and psychological writing and an outward and realist one, at its best fusing the two; and an experimental tradition that is usually more passionate about form than content, perception than emotion, restless with the conventions of the art, skeptical about the political underpinnings of current practice, and intent on inventing a new one, or at least undermining what seems repressive in the current formed style. [...] At the moment there are poets doing good, bad, and indifferent work in all these ranges." Critic Maureen McLane said of Hass' description that "it's hard to imagine a more judicious account of major tendencies."
 The appointment of Billy Collins as Poet Laureate Consultant in Poetry to the Library of Congress generated a protest in which Anselm Hollo was elected "anti-laureate" in a contest run by Robert Archambeau (the influential online POETICS list at the University of Buffalo served as the main forum).

Works published in English
Listed by nation where the work was first published and again by the poet's native land, if different; substantially revised works listed separately:

Australia
 Robert Adamson Mulberry Leaves: New & Selected Poems 1970–2001
 Les Murray, Conscious & Verbal, shortlisted for the 2002 International Griffin Poetry Prize
 Philip Salom, A Cretive Life. (sic.) (Fremantle Arts Centre) 
 Chris Wallace-Crabbe, By and Large, Manchester: Carcanet; and Sydney; Brandl and Schlesinger

Canada
 Bruce Andrews, Lip Service (Coach House Books) 
 Louise Bak, Tulpa (Coach House Books) 
 Gary Barwin, Raising Eyebrows (Coach House Books) 
 Christian Bök, Eunoia, winner of the 2002 Canadian Griffin Poetry Prize (Coach House Books) 
 George Elliott Clarke:
 Execution Poems: The Black Acadian Tragedy of George and Rue. Wolfville, Nova Scotia, Gaspereau Press,  Canada
 Blue. Vancouver: Polestar, 
 Victor Coleman, Honeymoon Suite/Letter Drop, illustrations by David Bolduc, (Coach House Books) 
 Diane Keating, The Year One: New and Selected Poems
 Karen MacCormack, At Issue (Coach House Books) 
 Steve McCaffery:
Seven Pages Missing Volume 1 (Coach House Books) 
Seven Pages Missing Volume 2: Selected Ungathered Work (Coach House Books) 
 Roy Miki, Surrender winner of the 2002 Governor General's Award for poetry
 W. Mark Sutherland, Code X (Coach House Books) 
 Sharon Thesen, editor, The New Long Poem Anthology, Burnaby, British Columbia: Talonbooks
 Daniel Wincenty, Words of Wisdom from a Man Claiming to be Fred Rogers (Coach House Books)

India, in English
 Imtiaz Dharker, I Speak for the Devil ( Poetry in English ), first foreign edition brought out from United Kingdom by Bloodaxe (first India edition: Penguin Books India, 2003)
 Ranjit Hoskote, The Sleepwalker's Archive ( Poetry in English ), Mumbai: Single File
 Arundhathi Subramaniam, On Cleaning Bookshelves ( Poetry in English ), Mumbai:  Allied Publishers, 
 Sudeep Sen, Perpetual Diary, London: Aark Arts
 K. Satchidanandan, So Many Births: Three Decades of Poetry, Konarak Publishers Pvt Ltd, Delhi

Ireland
 Pat Boran, As the Hand, the Glove (Dedalus)
 Eiléan Ní Chuilleanáin: The Girl Who Married the Reindeer, Oldcastle: The Gallery Press, Ireland
 Tom French (poet), Touching the Bones, Oldcastle: The Gallery Press, 
 Seamus Heaney, Electric Light, Faber & Faber; Irish poet published in the United Kingdom
 Paul Muldoon, Poems 1968–1998 (Farrar, Straus & Giroux); a New York Times "notable book of the year"; Irish poet living in the United States
 Aidan Murphy (poet), Looking in at Eden, New Island Books,

New Zealand
 Alistair Campbell, Maori Battalion: a poetic sequence, Wellington: Wai-te-ata Press
 Allen Curnow, The Bells of Saint Babel's, a winner of the Montana New Zealand Book Awards
 Leigh Davis:
 The Book of Hours, Auckland: Jack Books
 General Motors, Auckland: Jack Books
 Lauris Edmond, Selected Poems 1975–2000, edited by K. O. Arvidson, Wellington: Bridget Williams Books, posthumous
 Bill Manhire, Collected Poems
 Cilla McQueen, Axis, Otago University Press
 Paul Millar, Spark to a Waiting Fuse: James K. Baxter's Correspondence with Noel Ginn 1942–1946
 Michael O'Leary, He Waiatanui Kia Aroha
 Hone Tuwhare, Piggyback Moon
 Ian Wedde, The Commonplace Odes
 Kate Camp, Realia, Victoria University Press

United Kingdom
 Eavan Boland, Code
 Ciarán Carson: The Twelfth of Never, Picador, Wake Forest University Press
 Kate Clanchy, Slattern
 Carol Ann Duffy, editor, Hand in Hand: An Anthology of Love Poems, Picador (anthology); 36 poets from around the world were each invited to select a love poem written by someone of the opposite sex and appearing opposite the selecting poet's own love poem
 James Fenton: A Garden from a Hundred Packets of Seed, Viking / Farrar, Straus and Giroux
 Seamus Heaney, Electric Light, Faber & Faber; Irish poet published in the United Kingdom
 Geoffrey Hill, Speech! Speech!
 Selima Huill, Bunny
 Elizabeth Jennings, Timely Issues
 Derek Mahon, Selected Poems. Penguin
 Andrew Motion, Here to Eternity
 Paul Muldoon, Vera of Las Vegas; Irish poet living in the United States and published in the United Kingdom
 Sean O'Brien, Downriver (Picador)
 Craig Raine, Collected Poems 1978–1999
 Peter Reading, [untitled]
 W.G. Sebald For Years Now. Short Books.
 Jo Shapcott, Tender Taxes
 Hugo Williams, Curtain Call: 101 Portraits in Verse, (editor) Faber and Faber
 Benjamin Zephaniah, Too Black, Too Strong

Criticism, scholarship and biography in the United Kingdom
 Stephen Wade, editor, Gladsongs and Gatherings: Poetry and Its Social Context in Liverpool Since the 1960s, Liverpool University Press,

Anthologies in the United Kingdom
 Keith Tuma, Anthology of Twentieth-Century British and Irish Poetry (Oxford University Press)
 Elaine Feinstein, Ted Hughes – The Life of a Poet, Weidenfeld & Nicolson

United States
 Elizabeth Alexander, Antebellum Dream Book
 Ralph Angel, Twice Removed (Sarabande)
 Renée Ashley, The Revisionist's Dream
 Bei Dao, At the Sky's Edge: Poems 1991–1996 (New Directions) 
 Eavan Boland, Against Love Poetry (Norton); a New York Times "notable book of the year"
 Edward Brathwaite, Ancestors, Barbadian poet living in the United States
 Joseph Brodsky: Nativity Poems, translated by Melissa Green; New York: Farrar, Straus & Giroux, Russian-American
 Paul Celan, translated by John Felstiner, Selected Poems and Prose of Paul Celan (Norton); a New York Times "notable book of the year"
 Maxine Chernoff, World: Poems 1991–2001 (Salt Publications)
 Billy Collins, Sailing Alone Around the Room: New and Selected Poems (Random House); a New York Times "notable book of the year"
 W.S. Di Piero, Skirts and Slacks: Poems (Knopf); a New York Times "notable book of the year"
 Ed Dorn, Chemo Sábe, Limberlost Press (posthumous)
 Alice Fulton, Felt  (Norton); a Los Angeles Times "Best Book of 2001"
 Seamus Heaney, Electric Light (Farrar, Straus & Giroux); a New York Times "notable book of the year"; Irish poet living in the United States
 Jane Hirshfield, Given Sugar, Given Salt
 Paul Hoover, Rehearsal in Black, (Cambridge, England: Salt Publications)
 James Merrill, Collected Poems, edited by J.D. McClatchy and Stephen Yenser (Knopf); a New York Times "notable book of the year"
 W. S. Merwin, The Pupil, New York: Knopf
 Paul Muldoon, Poems 1968–1998 (Farrar, Straus & Giroux); a New York Times "notable book of the year"; Irish poet living in the United States
 Amos Oz, The Same Sea (Harcourt); a novel about sexual hanky-panky involving a man, son and several women; most of the book is in verse; the author collaborated on the translation by Nicholas de Lange); a New York Times "notable book of the year"
 Carl Phillips, The Tether
 James Reiss, Ten Thousand Good Mornings
 Jay Wright, Transfigurations: Collected Poems (Louisiana State University Press); a New York Times "notable book of the year"

Anthologies in the United States
 Caroline Kennedy, editor, The Best-Loved Poems of Jacqueline Kennedy Onassis, a hardcover New York Times best seller for 15 weeks late this year and into 2002.
 Michelle Yeh and N. G. D. Malmqvist, Frontier Taiwan: An Anthology of Contemporary Chinese Poetry, Columbia University Press
 The Best American Poetry 2001, edited by David Lehman, co-edited this year by Robert Hass (including 75 poets)

Criticism, scholarship and biography in the United States
 Kate Sontag and David Graham, editors, After Confession: Poetry as Autobiography, Graywolf Press

Other in English
 Edward Brathwaite, Ancestors, Barbadian poet living in the United States
 Pamela Mordecai, Certifiable, Jamaican

Works published in other languages
Listed by nation where the work was first published and again by the poet's native land, if different; substantially revised works listed separately:

French language

Canada, in French
 Edmond Robillard, Montréal: Maxime
 Jean Royer, Nos corps habitables: Poèmes choisis, 1984–2000, Montréal: Le Noroît

France
 Yves Bonnefoy:
 Le Théâtre des enfants
 Le Cœur-espace
 Les Planches courbes
 Seyhmus Dagtekin, Le verbe temps, publisher: L'Harmattan; Kurdish Turkish poet writing in and published in France
 Claude Esteban:
 Morceaux de ciel, presque rien, Gallimard
 Etranger devant la porte, I. Variations, Farrago

India
In each section, listed in alphabetical order by first name:

Bengali
 Mallika Sengupta:
 Deoyalir Rat, Kolkata: Patralekha
 Amra Lasya Amra Ladai, Kolkata: Sristi Prakashani
 Nirendranath Chakravarti, Kobi Cheney, Shompurno Cheney Na, Kolkata: Dey's Publishing; Bengali-language

Other in India
 Basudev Sunani, Asprushya, Bhubaneswar: National Institute of Social Work and Social Sciences; Oraya-language
 Gulzar, Triveni, New Delhi: Rupa& Co.; in both Urdu and Hindi languages
 Hemant Divate, Chautishiparyantachya Kavita, Mumbai: Prabhat Prakashan; Marathi-language
 Malathi Maithri, Sankarabharani, Nagercoil: Kalachuvadu Pathippagam; Tamil-language
 Manushya Puthiran, Neeralanathu, Nagercoil: Kalachuvadu Pathipagam, Tamil language
 Nitin Kulkarni, Sagla Kasa Agdi Safehaina, Mumbai: Lokvangmaya Griha Prakashan; Marathi-language

Poland
 Juliusz Erazm Bolek, Ars poetica
 Julia Hartwig, Nie ma odpowiedzi ("There's no Answer"), 98 pages; Warsaw: Sic! 
 Ewa Lipska,  ("Pet Shops"); Kraków: Wydawnictwo literackie
 Tadeusz Różewicz, Nożyk profesora ("The Professor's Knife"), Wrocław: Wydawnictwo Dolnośląskie
 Tomasz Różycki,  ("Country Cottage"), Warsaw: Lampa i Iskra Boża
 Jan Twardowski, Kiedy mówisz. When You Say, Kraków: Wydawnictwo Literackie, Kraków: Wydawnictwo Literackie

Other languages
 Christoph Buchwald, general editor, and Adolf Endler, guest editor, Jahrbuch der Lyrik 2002 ("Poetry Yearbook 2002"), publisher: Beck; anthology; Germany
 Katrine Marie Guldager, Ankomst Husumgade, publisher: Gyldendal; Denmark
 Klaus Høeck, In nomine, publisher: Gyldendal; Denmark
 Chen Kehua, Hua yu lei yu heliu ("Flowers and Tears and Rivers") Chinese (Taiwan)
 Jun Er, Chenmo yu xuanhua de shijie ("Quiet in a Tumultuous World"), Chinese (People's Republic of China)
 Rahman Henry, Circusmukhorito Graam, ( A Book of Poetry ), Bangladesh.
 Rie Yasumi, 平凡な兎 ("Ordinary Rabbit") and やすみりえのとっておき川柳道場 ("Senryu Dojo reserve: Fun begins at any time"), Japan

Awards and honors

Australia
 C. J. Dennis Prize for Poetry: John Mateer, Barefoot Speech
 Dinny O'Hearn Poetry Prize: Untold Lives and Later Poems by Rosemary Dobson
 Kenneth Slessor Prize for Poetry: Ken Taylor, Africa
 Miles Franklin Award: Frank Moorhouse, Dark Palace

Canada
 Gerald Lampert Award: Anne Simpson, Light Falls Through You
 Archibald Lampman Award: Colin Morton, Coastlines of the Archipelago
 Atlantic Poetry Prize: Anne Simpson, Light Falls Through You
 2001 Governor General's Awards: George Elliott Clarke, Execution Poems (English); Paul Chanel Malenfant, Des ombres portées (French)
 Griffin Poetry Prize (Canada): Anne Carson, Men in the Off Hours
 Griffin Poetry Prize (International, in the English Language): Nikolai Popov and Heather McHugh, translation of Glottal Stop: 101 Poems by Paul Celan
 Pat Lowther Award: Sharon Thesen, A Pair of Scissors
 Prix Alain-Grandbois: Martine Audet, Les tables
 Dorothy Livesay Poetry Prize: Don McKay, Another Gravity
 Prix Émile-Nelligan: Mathieu Boily, Le grand respir

New Zealand
 Prime Minister's Awards for Literary Achievement:
 Montana New Zealand Book Awards (no winner in poetry category this year) First-book award for poetry: Stephanie de Montalk, Animals Indoors, Victoria University Press

United Kingdom
 Cholmondeley Award: Ian Duhig, Paul Durcan, Kathleen Jamie, Grace Nichols
 Eric Gregory Award: Leontia Flynn, Thomas Warner, Tishani Doshi, Patrick Mackie, Kathryn Gray, Sally Read
 Forward Poetry Prize (Best Collection): Sean O'Brien, Downriver (Picador)
 Forward Poetry Prize (Best First Collection): John Stammers, The Panoramic Lounge Bar (Picador)
 Queen's Gold Medal for Poetry: Michael Longley
 T. S. Eliot Prize (United Kingdom and Ireland): Anne Carson, The Beauty of the Husband
 Whitbread Award for poetry: Selima Hill, Bunny

United States
 Agnes Lynch Starrett Poetry Prize awarded to Gabriel Gudding for A Defense of Poetry
 Aiken Taylor Award for Modern American Poetry, Frederick Morgan
 American Book Award, Janet McAdams, for "The Island of Lost Luggage"
 Bernard F. Connors Prize for Poetry, Gabrielle Calvocoressi, for "Circus Fire, 1944"
 Bollingen Prize for Poetry, Louise Glück
 Brittingham Prize in Poetry, Robin Behn, Horizon Note
 Frost Medal: Sonia Sanchez
 National Book Award for Poetry: Alan Dugan, Poems Seven: New and Complete Poetry
 Poet Laureate Consultant in Poetry to the Library of Congress: Billy Collins appointed
 Poets' Prize: Philip Booth, Lifelines: Selected Poems 1950–1999
 Pulitzer Prize for Poetry: Stephen Dunn, Different Hours
 Robert Fitzgerald Prosody Award: Edward Weismiller
 Ruth Lilly Poetry Prize: Yusef Komunyakaa
 Wallace Stevens Award: John Ashbery
 Whiting Awards: Joel Brouwer, Jason Sommer
 William Carlos Williams Award: Ralph J. Mills, Grasses Standing: Selected Poems, Judge: Fanny Howe

Other
 France: Prix Goncourt for poetry: Claude Esteban, for his oeuvre as a whole

Deaths
Birth years link to the corresponding "[year] in poetry" article:
January 17 – Gregory Corso (born 1930), American Beat Generation poet, of prostate cancer
February 25 – A. R. Ammons (born 1926), American author and poet
February 14 – Alan Ross (born 1922), British writer and poet
February 22 – Leo Connellan (born 1928), American poet
March 23 – Louis Dudek (born 1918), Canadian poet, academic critic and publisher
 August 28 – Sansei Yamao (born 1938), Japanese poet and friend of the American poet Gary Snyder
September 23 – Allen Curnow (born 1911), New Zealand poet and journalist
October 16 – Anne Ridler (born 1912), English poet and Faber and Faber editor
October 20 – Andrew Waterhouse (born 1958), English poet and environmentalist, suicide
October 26:
Pamela Gillilan (born 1918), English poet
Elizabeth Jennings (born 1926), English poet
November 18 – R. N. Currey (born 1907), English poet
November 25 – David Gascoyne (born 1915), English poet associated with the Surrealist movement
December 8 – Agha Shahid Ali (born 1949), Kashmiri-born English-language American poet
December 20 – Léopold Sédar Senghor (born 1906), first President of Senegal, poet and writer
December 27 – Ian Hamilton (born 1938), British poet, critic and magazine publisher
Date not known – Bill Sewell (born 1951), New Zealand poet, German literary scholar and lawyer

See also

Poetry
List of years in poetry
List of poetry awards

Notes

 "A Timeline of English Poetry" Web page of the Representative Poetry Online Web site, University of Toronto

2000s in poetry
Poetry